Brahin may refer to:

Brahin (meteorite), a pallasite meteorite found in Belarus
Brahin Raion, a district of Gomel, Belarus
Brahin, Belarus (Брагін), a town in Brahin Raion

See also
Bragin (disambiguation)